Moscow Yaroslavsky railway station is one of the nine main railway stations in Moscow.
Situated on Komsomolskaya Square (close to the Kazansky and Leningradsky Stations), Moscow Yaroslavskaya has the highest passenger throughput of all nine of the capital's main-line terminuses. It serves eastern destinations, including those in the Russian Far East, being the western terminus of the world's longest railway line, the Trans-Siberian. The station takes its name from that of the ancient city of Yaroslavl which, lying 284 rail kilometres (176 miles) north-east of Moscow, is the first large city served by the line.

History
The early history of Yaroslavsky railway station is mainly linked to the construction of a number of railway lines in the north of the European part of Russia. These routes, which connect cities such as Yaroslavl, Kostroma, Arkhangelsk or Vologda with Moscow and each other, all emerged in the second half of the 19th century, during a railway construction boom in the Russian Tsarist Empire. At that time, they were operated by a public limited company, the Moscow-Yaroslavl-Arkhangelsk Railway Company (Общество Московско-Ярославско-Архангельской железной дороги), which was financed by private investors. This distinguished the Moscow-Yaroslavl-Arkhangelsk railway from the Nikolaibahn, which was built a few years earlier and which was state-owned from the outset because of its strategic importance.

The oldest part of the Moscow-Yaroslavl-Arkhangelsk railway was built just a few years after the company was founded on 29 May 1859. It is about 70 kilometers long railway line between Moscow and the city of Sergiyev Posad, where the famous Trinity Monastery was located. Since the latter is worshiped in the Russian Orthodox Church as a sanctuary and therefore had regularly attracted pilgrims, recognized in the 1850s, some entrepreneurs saw the benefits of a railway connection of this place to the old Tsar capital. From a continuation of the route over Sergiev Posad addition was initially not mentioned. The main initiator of the track construction was the military engineer Baron Andrei Ivanovich Delwig (1813-1887), later chief inspector of the Russian Railways and founder of one of the first railway technical schools in Russia. He and the co-founders were able to convince a number of merchants of the expected high profitability of the future rail line, which the necessary seed capital for the public company could be collected without major delays.

A few months before the founding of the company, which initially bore the abbreviated name of the Society of the Moscow-Yaroslavl Railway, the initiators requested permission from Tsar Alexander II to plan and construct the railway line. This came in July 1858 with an order to complete the track construction by mid-1862 at the latest and at the same time to begin the planning work for a possible route continuation to Yaroslavl. Since the technical and legal conditions for the route relocation to Sergiev Posad had been good, they were able to be erected without great delays, in compliance with the deadline. On 22 July 1862, after a little more than two years of construction, the first sample train left the newly built head station in Moscow. On 18 August of the same year the railway line was solemnly handed over to regular passenger traffic, initially with two train pairs per day. A few months later, freight traffic between Moscow and Sergiyev Posad was also started. As early as 1864, the track was double-railed along its entire length.

Originally, the route was known as the Trinity train, because it had the railway connection of the Trinity monastery to the target. This should change however already eight years after the opening. With a total of over 450,000 carried passengers in the first three years of their operation, the railway proved to be very successful, which left the Board of the Moscow-Yaroslavl railway company no doubt about the profitability of an extension to the northeast. Thus, the 210 kilometers long, already planned for the construction of the Trinity train continuation of the route to the Volgametropole Yaroslavl in February 1870, after one and a half years of construction, put into operation. In 1872, a narrow gauge line from Yaroslavl to Vologda was built (it was rebuilt as broad gauge in 1915), 1887 the railway line from Yaroslavl to Kostroma and 1898 finally the narrow gauge railway from Vologda to the old northern port city of Arkhangelsk.

The length of the Moscow-Yaroslavl-Arkhangelsk Railway at the turn of the century was already over 1100 kilometers, the previously built over 60 branches for the people, goods or industrial traffic as well as some smaller local railway lines not included. In 1900, the company of the Moscow-Yaroslavl-Arkhangelsk Railway was bought up by the Russian state and later renamed the Northern Railway (Северная железная дорога) section of the Russian Railways - a name which this department still bears today. With the construction of more than 700 kilometers long railway line from Vologda to Vyatka in 1905, the northern railway was linked directly to the simultaneously relocated Trans-Siberian Railway, bringing the sections Moscow-Yaroslavl, Yaroslavl-Danilov, Danilow-Bui and Bui-Vyatka part of this longest artery Russia.

Since the route built by the company of the Moscow-Yaroslavl-Arkhangelsk railway was originally intended to go only to Sergiev Posad, the first plans for their Moscow terminus station did not provide for a major facility. For the location of the future hub, several locations within the former city limits were available. The decision to build the station next to the existing Nikolaibahnhof was made in October 1860. At the same time it was decided to build the planned terminus of the railway line from Moscow via Ryazan to Saratov, today's Kazan station, on the south side of the same square. Strictly speaking, the present day seat of the three stations did not constitute an inner-city square at that time, but a large unpaved area near the eastern outskirts of Moscow. To the left of the Nikolaibahnhof were some residential and warehouse buildings of the Nikolaibahn and further to the left of it the 23-hectare Red Pond (Красный пруд), which was filled in during the expansion work for the station square and is now completely overbuilt.

After preparation of the building plot 1861 began work on the construction of the station facilities. These as well as all station buildings could be inaugurated exactly to the admission of the regular train traffic, on 18 August 1862, solemnly. The platforms and tracks of the new station received a similar arrangement as the Nikolaibahnhof: In the backyard of the reception building, which had an approximately Π-shaped plan, along its two side extensions, two platforms were built, of which the right for the exit and the left for the arrival of the trains was used. In total, the station in its original design comprised six tracks, two of which were used for passenger traffic. In addition to the tracks, a reception building for passenger transport, a workshop, a steam locomotive depot and a wagon hall were built.

The design of the reception building was commissioned by the architect Michail Lewestam, whose original design was later modified by the St. Petersburg Academy of Arts Professor Roman Kusmin. The two-storey, up to 12-meter-high brick building was similar in style to a simple classicist functional building: It had two floors and a strictly symmetrical outside look with a flag pole in the middle part of the roof. This made the station look like an ordinary Russian administration building at that time. The house consisted of three parts: the prestigious central part and two lateral, rear-extended extensions. On the ground floor of the right-hand extension, which extended along the departure platform, there were waiting rooms of the first, second and third class, while on the left-hand side there was a space for the loading and storage of luggage and the administrative seat of the railway company. The central part of the building, which faced the present-day Komsomolskaya Square with its front facade, housed counter halls, a telegraph office and an entrance hall, via which passengers could directly access the platforms from the square. On the upper floor of the entire reception building, service rooms and staff apartments were accommodated.

Expansion
The first significant expansion of the Yaroslavlsky railway station took place in 1868 in the course of the extension of the railway to Yaroslavl. Above all, it aimed at increasing capacity for the expected increase in passenger flows. The central part of the reception building remained unchanged, but the two side extensions were extended, the left extension received an additional floor.

There was another expansion shortly after the acquisition of the Moscow-Yaroslavl-Arkhangelsk railway company by the state. Since the total length of the railway lines and the number of passengers had risen significantly up to then compared to the 1860s, the capacity of the last station, which was extended in 1868, was no longer sufficient in 1900 to ensure smooth handling. However, the expansion headed by Moscow-based architect Lew Kekushev was largely limited to upgrading the platform facilities, while the reception building did not undergo any significant changes this time. Kekushev had a new platform built with a canopy, which was supported by architecturally striking arched portals column constructions, with a covering of black granite. These pillars are still preserved as part of the interior of one of the waiting rooms. In addition, a water tower was built next to the reception building to supply water to the station and the steam trains.

Since this conversion measure could not meet the ever-increasing numbers of passengers, was at the beginning of the 20th Century, a fundamental expansion of the entire station needed. Fjodor Schechtel, at that time one of the most renowned Art Nouveau architects, submitted a draft in 1902, according to which the station was to be equipped, above all, according to its significance as the northern entrance gate of Moscow. He intended a reconstruction in traditional Moscow styles, which, however, have a clear reference to the ancient architecture of northern Russian towns and thus should express a close connection of Moscow to the Russian north. This idea of Schechtel was accepted with approval, so that the Moscow Governor-General issued the conversion permit in August 1902. The construction work under Schechtel's direction lasted from 1902 to 1904, the solemn inauguration of the renewed station took place on 19 December 1904.

When reconstructing the existing reception building, two new supplementary buildings were erected on both sides, and the two rear building sections were extended. The old central part of the building has been completely redesigned by adding three tower constructions and making massive changes to the front façade. The 1900 water tower was integrated into the left tower of the central reception building. Schechtel's conversion enabled the capacity of Yaroslavl railway station to be roughly tripled. In addition, Schechtel managed to keep the conversion costs relatively cheap: these amounted to about 300,000 rubles, while the much simpler earlier works had devoured 220,000 rubles.

To date, the 1904 completed Yaroslavl railway station is one of the best known works of Fyodor Schechtel. Since it, like all other buildings of his, is a listed building, all later station modifications were limited to extensions of the building from behind and to redesign and installation of platforms and tracks, while the front facade of the reception building to see today largely in its original state from 1904.

The following major expansion of the Yaroslavl railway station took place in 1965–1966. Here, in the basement rooms of the station building originally used for the heating systems, luggage storage compartments were set up, whereby additional space on the ground floor could be obtained. In addition, the building received in its rear, the track-facing part of a two-story extension with a reinforced concrete and glass facade held. Today, this extension houses a ticket hall for public transport and part of the waiting room. Built in 1900 by Lew Kekuschew platform was integrated into it. Since then, its black granite pillars have been inside the building, while all platforms have been moved a few meters to the north. In particular, new space for long-distance traffic clearance was gained in this reorganization: The total area of the premises designated for this purpose was increased by more than 70 percent.

In the mid-1990s and beginning of the 2000s, further expansion and modernization measures for the Yaroslavl railway station followed, with which the handling capacity could be doubled again by fundamentally redesigning the interiors of the reception building. At the same time, the front facade was repainted, the roof renewed and the furnishings of the waiting rooms brought to the state of the art.

On 3 August 2001, the station hit the headlines after Kim Jong-il arrived there at 9:40 pm with an armored special train. The North Korean leader was on a state visit to Russia and traveled across the Trans-Siberian route from Vladivostok, which is close to the Russian-North Korean border, to Moscow, where he was received by President Vladimir Putin. On the evening of his arrival in Moscow, the entire Yaroslavl railway station was evacuated for several hours, and all trains departing or arriving at that time were canceled or diverted.

Trains and destinations

Long-distance from Moscow

Yaroslavsky is served by all trains to the Russian Far East. The only international railway lines are Pyongyang (rare) and Beijing (owned by Chinese Railways and Russia Railways).

» : through coach(es)

Other destinations

Suburban destinations
Suburban commuter trains (elektrichka) connect Yaroslavsky Rail station stations and platforms of the Yaroslavsky suburban railway line, in particular, with the towns of Mytishchi, Korolyov, Shchyolkovo, Monino, Ivanteyevka, Fryazino, Pushkino, Krasnoarmeysk, Khotkovo, Sergiyev Posad, and Alexandrov.

Gallery

References

External links

Yaroslavsky station 
Russian Railways (Российские Железные Дороги) 
Chinese Railways (中国铁路) 
Mongolian Railways (Улаанбааатар төмөр зам) 
Photo gallery of architectural details
Virtual tour to Leningradsky, Yaroslavsky, and Kazansky train station

1862 establishments in the Russian Empire
Art Nouveau architecture in Moscow
Art Nouveau railway stations
Railway stations in Moscow
Railway stations of Moscow Railway
Railway stations in the Russian Empire opened in 1862
Railway stations in the Russian Empire opened in 1904
Cultural heritage monuments of federal significance in Moscow